Balfour Street Park is a public pocket park located in an inner-city suburb of Sydney, in the state of New South Wales, Australia. The park is located in the suburb of Chippendale, at the corner of Balfour Street and O’Connor Street. Balfour Street Park acts as a pedestrian gateway to Central Park and was designed by the City of Sydney in collaboration with JILA, and constructed by Design Landscape for Frasers Property. It won the Horbury Hunt Brick Award for Urban Design and Landscape Architecture in 2010.

History 
The area was originally overgrown and weed infested land not being put to any use, owned by the State Rail Authority. However, in 2011 local residents with cooperation from North Sydney Council under the Streets Alive program, which allows the community to create and maintain public gardens on land owned by State Government authorities, were able to gain public access and permission to create a park. It was formally opened on 19 June 2011 by the Lord Mayor.

Design 
The initial design of Balfour Street Park was done by Sue Barnsley Design, aiming to mediate the two differing scales of the large scale adjacent Central Park development and the smaller scale residential nature of the site. JILA retained this conceptual design and sought to expand upon it through the incorporation of the richness of the materials and intimate detail which relates back to the human scale. By closing Balfour Street between O’Connor and Wellington Streets, the park is able to offer more open space for local residents, and provide an essential pedestrian and cyclist connection to
Broadway, improving local traffic management.

Features 
The dominant material in the design of the pocket park is bricks, to connect to the materiality of the surrounding buildings. The bricks are laid on two different axes with one direction facing the drainage channel and the other facing towards the grass area. A brick swale with arching antenna lighting acts as the focal point of the park during the day and at night, in addition to providing a drainage point. The brick swale also incorporates protruding bricks which detain any rubbish and slow down the water
flow. Furthermore, the site references the area’s built history and character through the paving materials, including trachyte recycled from local kerbing.

Flora and fauna 
Balfour Street Park has a variety of native species of planting including NSW Christmas Bush, Banksia, Bottlebrush, Port Jackson cypress, Lillypilly, Tea tree, Eucalyptus and Grevillea. Native planting along the border of the park were selected in order to screen the railway line and attract native birds.

Gallery

See also 

 Parks in Sydney

References 

Parks in Sydney
Chippendale, New South Wales
2011 establishments in Australia
Parks established in 2011